Bell Potter Securities is an Australian stockbroking, investment and financial advisory firm that provides financial services to individuals, institutions and corporations. Founded in 1970, Bell Potter has one of Australia’s largest retail distribution networks with over 325 advisers, operating across 13 offices in Australia, as well as offices in London, New York and Hong Kong. Bell Potter is a part of the Bell Financial Group of companies (ASX:BFG).

References

External links 
 Bell Potter Securities Website
 Bell Financial Group Website

Financial services companies of Australia